Ho Min-hao (born 10 July 1958), also known by the English name Mark Ho, is a Taiwanese politician who served two terms in the Legislative Yuan between 2002 and 2008.

Education
Ho earned a bachelor's degree from National Chung Hsing University and attended graduate school at Tunghai University.

Political career
Ho served on the third National Assembly as a member of the Democratic Progressive Party, but switched affiliations to represent the newly founded Taiwan Solidarity Union in the 2001 legislative elections. During his first term, Ho was a member of the Legislative Yuan's National Defense Committee. Near the start of his second term, the Taiwan Solidarity Union named Ho one of its caucus whips. He was named the TSU candidate for the mayoralty of Taichung in April 2005, and reelected as one of four TSU caucus whips in June. Incumbent Taichung mayor Jason Hu retained his office, and Ho was later named a member of the Taiwan Solidarity Union's Central Executive Committee. Ho rejoined the Democratic Progressive Party in November 2007, and lost his legislative seat to Daniel Huang.

References

1958 births
Democratic Progressive Party Members of the Legislative Yuan
Taiwan Solidarity Union Members of the Legislative Yuan
Members of the 5th Legislative Yuan
Members of the 6th Legislative Yuan
Taichung Members of the Legislative Yuan
National Chung Hsing University alumni
Tunghai University alumni
Living people